Norfolk Football Club was an English football club based in the Norfolk Park suburb of Sheffield.  It played Sheffield rules football from its foundation in 1861 until that code merged with association football in 1877, and association football thereafter until its demise some time in or after 1881.

Norfolk finished second in the 1867 Youdan Cup.  The club was responsible for proposing the introduction of the corner-kick into Sheffield Rules in 1868; the corner would subsequently be introduced into association football in 1872.

In 1880, the club reported to the Football Annual that it had moved away from its ground in Norfolk Park to Quibell's Field, near Hyde Park.  The last known reference to the club in the press dates from 1881.

Notes

References
 

Football clubs in England
Association football clubs established in 1861
1861 establishments in England
Sports teams and clubs in Sheffield
Defunct football clubs in England
Defunct football clubs in South Yorkshire
Association football clubs disestablished in 1881